Father and Son is a 1930 German-Swedish film directed by Victor Sjöström and starring Rudolf Rittner, Franziska Kinz and Martin Herzberg. It was shot at the Råsunda Studios in Stockholm. The film's sets were designed by the art director Vilhelm Bryde. A separate Swedish-language film was released the following year.

Cast
 Rudolf Rittner as Harald Hilding Markurell, the Innkeeper
 Franziska Kinz as Mrs. Karin Markurell
 Martin Herzberg as Johann Markurell
 Alfred Gerasch as Karl-Magnus de Lorche
 Carl Balhaus as Louis de Lorche
 Elfriede Borodin as Brita, the niece of Karl-Magnus
 Ernst Gronau as Sven Ström, the Barber
 Artur Retzbach as Per Ström, his brother, the School Janitor
 Philipp Manning as Principal
 Gustav Rickelt as the Dean. School Censor
 Ernst Dernburg as the Chemistry Professor. School Censor

References

Bibliography

External links 
 

1930 films
Films of the Weimar Republic
1930s German-language films
Films directed by Victor Sjöström
Films based on Swedish novels
Terra Film films
German multilingual films
German black-and-white films
Swedish black-and-white films
German drama films
Swedish drama films
1930 drama films
1930 multilingual films
1930s German films